Dmitry Alexeyevich Davydov (born 23 January 1978) is a former Russian professional association football player. He also holds Ukrainian citizenship as Dmytro Oleksiyovych Davydov.

Club career
He played 4 seasons in the Russian Football National League for FC SKA-Energiya Khabarovsk.

References

External links
 

1978 births
People from Novomoskovsk
Living people
Association football goalkeepers
Russian footballers
Ukrainian footballers
FC Metalurh Novomoskovsk players
FC Spartak Tambov players
FC SKA-Khabarovsk players
FC Spartak Sumy players
FC Tambov players
FC Lukhovitsy players
Ukrainian First League players
Ukrainian Second League players
Sportspeople from Dnipropetrovsk Oblast